Tiger Please is a Welsh indie / alternative rock five-piece band from Cardiff, Wales. The band formed in August 2008. The band's influences are U2, Sigur Rós, Kings of Leon, John Mayer and Counting Crows. They signed with Walnut Tree Records in 2009 and released their debut EP They Don't Change Under Moonlight. Kerrang! magazine, Rock Sound magazine, and Classic Rock magazine praised the EP and featured the band on the Rock Sound and Classic Rock cover-mount albums. The band toured with Kids In Glass Houses, InMe, Twin Atlantic and Funeral For A Friend.

During the summer of 2010, Tiger Please toured the United Kingdom and recorded a second EP called Seasons which was also critically acclaimed. They also played the Redbull tent at Download Festival in 2010 and the Jägermeister stage at Sonisphere Festival.

Discography

EPs
They Don't Change Under Moonlight (Walnut Tree Records, 2009)
Seasons (Walnut Tree Records, (2010)

References

November 2009 - Kerrang! Magazine, full page "Introducing" piece with Katie Parson and a KKKK review for 'They Don't Change Under Moonlight'
November 2009 - Rock Sound Magazine - 'They Don't Change Under Moonlight' review, 8/10
December 2009 - Big Cheese (magazine) - 'They Don't Change Under Moonlight' review, 4/5.
January 2010 - Classic Rock - Ones To Watch In 2010, plus a track on the cover CD.
January 2010 - Rock Sound Magazine - Full page exposure piece, plus a track on the cover CD.
March 2010 - Kerrang! Magazine - KKKK live review of London gig.
May 2010 - Big Cheese (magazine) - Review on 'Seasons'
June 2010 - Kerrang! Magazine - Generation Upstarts - Best Rising Bands To Watch At Download Festival.
June 2010 - Kerrang! Magazine - KKKK review of the band's live set at Download Festival
July 2010 - Music Week - Coverage of the band's endorsement with Fender.
July 2010 - The Fly - Preview of the band.
September 2010 - Kerrang! Magazine - Full page poster of the band.
September 2010 - Total Guitar Magazine - Preview of the band

2008 establishments in Wales
Welsh alternative rock groups
Musical groups established in 2008
Musical groups from Cardiff